Robert Bringhurst  (born 1946) is a Canadian poet, typographer and author. He has translated substantial works from Haida and Navajo and from classical Greek and Arabic. He wrote The Elements of Typographic Style, a reference book of typefaces, glyphs and the visual and geometric arrangement of type. He was named an Officer of the Order of Canada in June 2013.

He lives on Quadra Island, near Campbell River, British Columbia (approximately 170 km northwest of Vancouver) with his wife, Jan Zwicky, a poet and philosopher.

Life
Bringhurst was born on October 16, 1946, in Los Angeles, California, and raised in Utah, Montana, Wyoming, Alberta, and British Columbia. He studied architecture, linguistics, and physics at the Massachusetts Institute of Technology, and comparative literature and philosophy at the University of Utah. He holds a BA from Indiana University (1973) and an MFA in creative writing from the University of British Columbia (1975). In 2006, he was awarded an honorary doctorate from the University of the Fraser Valley, and in 2016 was awarded an honorary Doctorate of Letters by Simon Fraser University.

Bringhurst taught literature, art history and history of typography at several universities and held fellowships from the Canada Council for the Arts, the Social Sciences and Humanities Research Council of Canada, the American Philosophical Society, and the Guggenheim Foundation.

Literary career
His 1992 publication, The Elements of Typographic Style was praised as "the finest book ever written about typography" by the type designers Jonathan Hoefler and Tobias Frere-Jones. A collection of his poetry, The Beauty of the Weapons, was short-listed for a Governor General's Award in 1982, and A Story as Sharp as a Knife, his work on Haida symbolism, was nominated for a Governor General's Award in 2000. Bringhurst won the Lieutenant Governor's Award for Literary Excellence in 2005, an award which recognizes British Columbia writers who have contributed to the development of literary excellence in the province.

Work in Haida
Bringhurst has a strong interest in linguistics, translating works from classical Greek, Arabic, Navajo, and, most significantly, Haida. His interest in Haida culture stems from his friendship and close association with the influential Haida artist Bill Reid, with whom he wrote The Raven Steals the Light in 1984, among several other significant collaborations. It was this friendship that in 1987 "started Bringhurst on the philanthropic endeavour of recording the Haida canon". The result of this labour was a trilogy of works collectively titled Masterworks of the Classical Haida Mythtellers. The essays in its first volume, A Story As Sharp As A Knife, and particularly its nineteenth chapter, "The Prosody of Meaning," constitute an important contribution to the understanding of the poetics of oral literatures.

His translations from Haida have been viewed as an attempt to preserve the Haida culture, which in 1991 was considered part of a group "likely to be lost unless strong efforts are made very quickly to perpetuate them".  The Haida translation has caused some controversy. Bringhurst was accused of academic exploitation and cultural appropriation. In 2001, the CBC Radio program Ideas aired a two part series called "Land to Stand On."  The series' first episode featured "a string of Haida claiming [...] that Bringhurst's work is 'about keeping us in our place,' written 'without asking us,'" and "replete with 'serious errors twisting it into the poetry that he wants'".

In 1999, The Globe and Mail published a report on the Haida reaction to A Story as Sharp as a Knife by Adele Weder.  Weder's piece was later criticized for citing only two Haida sources, claiming they could speak for the entire Haida community, and was described as an "inflammatory article ... not likely to be mistaken for exemplary journalism". The Globe and Mail published Bringhurst's response, which was later called "considerably more measured".

In 2001, Jeff Leer reviewed A Story as Sharp as a Knife saying Bringhurst has neither formal linguistic education nor significant experience with spoken Haida, and doubting Bringhurst's ability to translate from Haida. Leer's review compared Bringhurst's work unfavourably to Enrico's Skidegate Haida Myths and Histories, and referred to the Weder review as an authoritative source. Leer's publisher, the International Journal of American Linguistics,  retracted the review and apologized to Bringhurst for publishing:

Most academic discussion and recognition of Bringhurst's work in Haida has been positive. Linguist Dell Hymes wrote a review of the Masterworks of the Classical Haida Mythtellers trilogy (of which A Story as Sharp as a Knife is part) in Language in Society, praising  the trilogy.  He said it "should become a classic reference point" for Haida scholars in the future. In 2004, Bringhurst won the Edward Sapir Prize for Masterworks of the Classical Haida Mythtellers. The committee giving the award was headed by Leanne Hinton, an expert in American Indian languages, and chair of the Department of Linguistics at the University of California, Berkeley.

Bringhurst has been defended by Margaret Atwood, who says that "territorial squabbling cannot obscure the fact that Bringhurst's achievement is gigantic as well as heroic", and that far from appropriating native voices, Masterworks of the Classical Haida Mythtellers "restores to life two exceptional poets we ought to know". The CBC documentary was attacked in print for relying "entirely on the fallacy, convenient to the producers, that Bringhurst had not consulted with any Haida".  Bringhurst with the help of Bill Reid had spent the better part of the previous decade working with members of the Haida community. People from other indigenous Canadian communities, such as the late Cree elder Wilna Hodgson have also defended Bringhurst. In a letter to the editor of Books in Canada, she called A Story as Sharp as a Knife "a gift to First Nation people across [Canada]", and a true "masterpiece in the growing genre of spoken texts". In her opinion, Bringhurst's "efforts are clearly informed with the kind of integrity that all translators might strive to emulate".

Bringhurst says that "culture is not genetic" and that he pays respect to Native American languages like Haida by allowing works from those languages to be appreciated as art by as wide an audience as possible. He says he always intended his translations to be "[exercises] in literary history, not in the interpretation of present-day Haida culture".

Bibliography

Poetry

 The Shipwright's Log, 1972
 Cadastre, 1973 
 Deuteronomy, 1974 (Sono Nis Press, Delta, British Columbia, Canada)
 Eight Objects, 1975 (Kanchenjunga Press)
 Bergschrund, 1975
 Tzuhalem's Mountain, 1982
 The Beauty of the Weapons: Selected Poems 1972–82, 1982, nominated for a Governor General's Award; 1985 (Copper Canyon Press)
 Tending the Fire, 1985
 The Blue Roofs of Japan, 1986 (Barbarian Press)
 Pieces of Map, Pieces of Music, 1986, 1987 (Copper Canyon Press)
 Conversations with a Toad, 1987
 The Calling: Selected Poems 1970–1995, 1995
 Elements, with drawings by Ulf Nilsen, 1995
 The Book of Silences, 2001
 Ursa Major, 2003, short-listed for the 2004 Dorothy Livesay Poetry Prize
 New World Suite Number Three: A Poem in Four Movements for Three Voices, 2006
 Selected Poems, 2009 (Gaspereau Press)
 Selected Poems, 2010 (Jonathan Cape)
 Selected Poems, 2012 (Copper Canyon Press)
 Stopping By, 2012 (Hirundo Press)
 Going Down Singing, 2016 (Two Ponds Press)

Prose

 Ocean/Paper/Stone, 1984
 The Raven Steals the Light, with Bill Reid, 1984
 Shovels, Shoes and the Slow Rotation of Letters, 1986
 The Black Canoe: Bill Reid and the Spirit of Haida Gwaii, with photographs by Ulli Steltzer, 1991
 Boats Is Saintlier Than Captains: Thirteen Ways of Looking at Morality, Language, and Design, 1997
 Native American Oral Literatures and the Unity of the Humanities, 1998
 A Short History of the Printed Word, with Warren Chappell, 1999
 A Story as Sharp as a Knife: The Classical Haida Mythtellers and Their World, 1999, nominated for a Governor General's Award; 2nd ed., 2011
 The Elements of Typographic Style, 1992; revised 1996; 2004, 2005, and 2008; 2012, 2015, and 2016
 The Solid Form of Language: An Essay on Writing and Meaning, 2004
 The Tree of Meaning: Thirteen Talks, 2006
 Everywhere Being Is Dancing, 2007
 The Surface of Meaning: Books and Book Design in Canada, 2008
 What Is Reading For?, 2011
 Palatino: The Natural History of a Typeface, 2016 (Book Club of California)

Translation
 Volumes 2 and 3 of the trilogy Masterworks of the Classical Haida Mythtellers (volume 1, A Story as Sharp as a Knife, is a prose work about Haida literature and is not primarily a work of translation)
 Ghandl of the Qayahl Llaanas, Nine Visits to the Mythworld (a collection of stories by the myth-teller Ghandl, as collected in 1900 by John Reed Swanton), 2000, short-listed for the 2001 Canadian Griffin Poetry Prize
 Skaay of the Qquuna Qiighawaay, Being in Being: The Collected Works of a Master Haida Mythteller (a collection of stories by the myth-teller Skaay, as collected by John Reed Swanton), 2001
 Parmenides, The Fragments, 2003
 Skaay of the Qquuna Qiighawaay, Siixha/Floating Overhead: The Qquna Cycle §3.3, 2007

Edited works
 Visions: Contemporary Art in Canada, 1983
 Jan Tschichold, The Form of the Book: Essays on the Morality of Good Design, 1991
 Bill Reid, Solitary Raven: The Essential Writings, 2000; 2nd ed., 2009
 Carving the Elements: A Companion to the Fragments of Parmenides, 2004
 François Mandeville, This Is What They Say, translated from Chipewyan by Ron Scollon, 2009
 Kay Amert, The Scythe and the Rabbit: Simon de Colines and the Culture of the Book in Renaissance Paris, 2012

Commentary
 Listening for the Heartbeat of Being: The Arts of Robert Bringhurst, edited by Brent Wood and Mark Dickinson – 2015

References

Footnotes

Works cited

Further reading 
 Brent Wood, Mark Dickinson (eds.): Listening for the Heartbeat of Being: The Arts of Robert Bringhurst, Montreal; Kingston; London; Chicago: McGill-Queen's University Press 2015,

External links 
 Griffin Poetry Prize biography
 Griffin Poetry Prize reading, including video clip
  (video)
 Records of Robert Bringhurst are held by Simon Fraser University's Special Collections and Rare Books
 The archives of Robert Bringhurst (Robert Bringhurst fonds (R11716) are held at Library and Archives Canada

1946 births
20th-century Canadian male writers
20th-century Canadian poets
20th-century Canadian translators
21st-century Canadian male writers
21st-century Canadian poets
21st-century Canadian translators
American emigrants to Canada
Canadian male non-fiction writers
Canadian male poets
Canadian typographers and type designers
Design writers
Indiana University Bloomington alumni
Living people
Officers of the Order of Canada
University of Utah alumni
Writers from British Columbia
Writers from Los Angeles